In science fiction, uplift is a developmental process to transform a certain species of animals into more intelligent beings by other, already-intelligent beings. This is usually accomplished by cultural, technological, or evolutional interventions like genetic engineering. The earliest appearance of the concept is in H. G. Wells's 1896 novel The Island of Doctor Moreau. The term was popularized by David Brin in his Uplift series in the 1980s.

History of the concept
The concept can be traced to H. G. Wells's novel The Island of Doctor Moreau (1896), in which the titular scientist transforms animals into horrifying parodies of humans through surgery and psychological torment. The resulting animal-people obsessively recite the Law, a series of prohibitions against reversion to animal behaviors, with the haunting refrain of "Are we not men?" Wells's novel reflects Victorian concerns about vivisection and of the power of unrestrained scientific experimentation to do terrible harm.

Other early literary examples can be found in the following works:
 Mikhail Bulgakov's Heart of a Dog (1921) tells the story of a stray dog, who is found by a surgeon, and undergoes extensive brain surgery for experimental purposes to create a New Soviet man.
 L. Sprague de Camp's "Johnny Black" stories (beginning with "The Command") about a black bear raised to human-level intelligence, published in Astounding Science-Fiction from 1938–1940. 
 Olaf Stapledon's Sirius (1944) explores a dog with human intelligence. 
 In Cordwainer Smith's Instrumentality of Mankind series "underpeople" are created from animals through unexplained technological means explicitly to be servants of humanity, and were often treated as less than slaves by the society that used them, until the laws were reformed in the story "The Ballad of Lost C'Mell" (1962). Smith's characterizations of underpeople are frequently quite sympathetic, and one of his most memorable characters is C'Mell, the cat-woman who appears in "The Ballad of Lost C'Mell" and in Norstrilia (1975).

David Brin has stated that his Uplift Universe was written at least in part in response to the common assumption in earlier science fiction such as Smith's work and Planet of the Apes that uplifted animals would, or even should, be treated as possessions rather than people. As a result, a significant part of the conflict in the series revolves around the differing policies of Galactics and humans toward their client races. Galactic races traditionally hold their uplifted "clients" in a hundred-millennium-long indenture, during which the "patrons" have extensive rights and claims over clients' lives and labor power. In contrast, humans have given their uplifted dolphins and chimpanzees near-equal civil rights, with a few legal and economic disabilities related to their unfinished state.  A key scene in Startide Rising is a discussion between a self-aware computer (the Niss) and a leading human (Gillian) about how the events during their venture (and hence the novel's plot) relate to the morality of the Galactics' system of uplift.

Timeline of works

Related terms and ideas
 Accelerated (Evolution): In the graphic novel Grease Monkey, Tim Eldred uses the term "Accelerated" to describe gorillas uplifted in this fashion.
 Forced Evolution: In her Canopus in Argos series, Doris Lessing uses the term "forced evolution" to encompass the conscious influencing of both biology and culture.
 Progressor (Evolution): Boris and Arkady Strugatsky coined the term "Progressor" for those who carry out this sort of work. Sergey Lukyanenko also used it in two of his novels.
 Provolution: Orion's Arm uses the term provolution (proactive or progressive evolution) to describe the act of accelerating evolution: a species which has had its evolution accelerated is called a provolve.
 Raelian Uplift: Several UFO cults including Raelianism believe that humanity was biologically uplifted in the past or will be uplifted in the future. The Urantia Book claims Adam and Eve were beings whose job it was to biologically uplift humanity.

See also
 Animal cognition
 Eugenics
 Intelligence amplification
 Talking animal
 Transhumanism

References

External links
 All Together Now: Developmental and Ethical Considerations for biologically uplifting nonhuman animals by George Dvorsky
 Great Ape Trust
 Fiction with "Uplifted" Animals: An Annotated Bibliography
 David Langford. "Uplift". The Encyclopedia of Science Fiction edited by John Clute, David Langford, Peter Nicholls and Graham Sleight. London: Gollancz, updated 21 December 2015. Web. Accessed 25 January 2016.

Science fiction themes
Biological engineering
Animal intelligence
Animals in popular culture